Summertime may refer to:

Seasons and time of day
 Summer, one of the temperate seasons
 Daylight saving time or summer time, advancing the clock one hour during the summer
 British Summer Time
 Central European Summer Time

Arts, entertainment, and media

Films 
 Summertime (1955 film), a British/American film starring Katharine Hepburn
 Summertime (2001 film), a South Korean film starring Choi Cheol-ho
 Summer Times, a 2009 Taiwanese film starring Bryant Chang and Shara Lin
 Summertime (2015 film), a French drama
 Summertime (2016 film), directed by Gabriele Muccino
 Summertime (2018 film), directed by Edward Burns
 Summertime (2020 film), directed by Carlos López Estrada
 Summer Hours (L'Heure d'été), a French film starring Juliette Binoche

Literature
 Summertime (novel), 2009, by J. M. Coetzee
 Summertime (1919 play), a comedy work by Louis N. Parker
 Summertime, a 1937 play by Ugo Betti
 Summertime, a 2000 play by Charles L. Mee

Music

Albums
 Summertime (Herb Alpert album), 1971
 Summertime (MFSB album), 1976
 Summertime (Paul Desmond album), 1969
 Summertime!, an EP by The Drums, 2005
 Summertime, by Joe Locke and Geoffrey Keezer, 2005
 Summertime, an EP by The Subways
 Summer Time (Roy Wang album), 2021

Songs
 "Summertime" (George Gershwin song), from the opera Porgy and Bess
 "Summertime" (Beyoncé song)
 "Summertime" (Bon Jovi song)
 "Summertime" (Brian Melo song)
 "Summertime" (DJ Jazzy Jeff & The Fresh Prince song)
 "Summertime" (Kenny Chesney song)
 "Summertime" (The Maybes? song)
 "Summertime" (New Kids on the Block song)
 "Summertime" (Selah Sue song)
 "Summertime" (The Sundays song)
 "Summertime" (Wiley song)
 "Summertime", by Another Level from Nexus
 "Summertime", by Aaron Carter from Another Earthquake!
 "Summertime", by Audio Adrenaline from Lift
 "Summertime", by Barenaked Ladies from All in Good Time
 "Summertime", by Bridgit Mendler from the soundtrack for the film Arrietty
 "Summertime", by The Buckinghams
 "Summertime", by The Click Five from Modern Minds and Pastimes
 "Summertime", by Cody Simpson, B-side of the single "iYiYi"
 "Summertime", by the Fire Theft from their self-titled album
 "Summertime", by Kreayshawn from Somethin' 'Bout Kreay
 "Summertime", by Michelle Branch from Everything Comes and Goes
 "Summertime", by Mos Def
 "Summertime", by My Chemical Romance from Danger Days: The True Lives of the Fabulous Killjoys
 "Summertime", by Sam Adams
 "Summertime", by Stromae from Cheese
 "Summertime", by Vince Staples from Summertime '06
 "Summertime", by Diana Ross from Red Hot Rhythm & Blues
 "Summertime, Summertime", a song by The Jamies
 "Summertime Summertime", a song by Corina
 "Summer Time" (song), by James Barker Band
 "Summer Time", by Pretty Things from the reissue of Parachute
 "Doin' Time", by Sublime, a loose cover version of the George Gershwin song, and frequently referred to as "Summertime", 1997
 "Sommartider" ("Summertimes"), a song by Per Gessle

Television
 Summertime (TV programme), a short drama from 1995
 Summertime (TV series), an Italian drama web television series distributed by Netflix in 2020
 Summertime '57/'58, a Canadian variety television series
 Summertime, a 1934 cartoon by Ub Iwerks, featured in a 1986 episode of Pee-wee's Playhouse

See also
 Summer (disambiguation)
 In the Summertime (disambiguation)
 Summertime Blues (disambiguation)